Jonatan Tanus (born 4 June 1995) is a Finnish professional ice hockey player. He is currently playing for SaiPa of the Finnish Liiga. Jonatan's father Michael Tanus has served as Tappara team doctor since 2007, through his father he also holds dual Israeli citizenship. His mother Sari was elected in the Parliament of Finland in 2015 representing the Christian Democrats.

Tanus made his Liiga debut playing with Tappara during the 2015–16 Liiga season.

References

External links

1995 births
Living people
Peterborough Petes (ice hockey) players
Lempäälän Kisa players
Tappara players
Finnish ice hockey left wingers
People from Kuopio
Finnish people of Israeli descent
SaiPa players
Sportspeople from North Savo